Maxwell James McCaffrey (born May 17, 1994) is a former wide receiver and an American football coach who is an offensive assistant for the Miami Dolphins of the National Football League (NFL). He was the offensive coordinator for the Bears at the University of Northern Colorado for the 2022 season. He played college football at Duke and signed with the Oakland Raiders as an undrafted free agent in 2016.

College career
In 53 games at Duke (38 starts), McCaffrey caught 117 passes for 1,341 yards and 12 touchdowns, and twice received Academic All-ACC honors.
In 2015, he started all 13 games, making 52 receptions for 643 yards (12.4 per catch) and five touchdowns.

Professional career

Oakland Raiders
On April 30, 2016, McCaffrey signed with the Oakland Raiders as an undrafted free agent following the conclusion of the 2016 NFL Draft. On August 29, 2016, he was released by the Raiders.

Green Bay Packers
On December 20, 2016, McCaffrey was signed to the Packers' practice squad. On January 21, 2017, McCaffrey was promoted to the active roster prior to the NFC Championship matchup against the Atlanta Falcons, as insurance for Jordy Nelson. However, he did not actually play in the championship game itself.  He remained with the Packers through the ensuing offseason and the 2017 preseason, before being waived on September 2, 2017.

New Orleans Saints
On September 3, 2017, McCaffrey was signed to the New Orleans Saints' practice squad.

Jacksonville Jaguars
On September 12, 2017, McCaffrey was signed to the Jacksonville Jaguars active roster off the Saints' practice squad after Allen Robinson was placed on injured reserve. In Week 5, against the Pittsburgh Steelers, he made his first NFL catch, a four-yard reception. He was waived by the Jaguars on October 21, 2017.

Green Bay Packers (second stint)
On October 24, 2017, McCaffrey was signed to the Packers' practice squad.

San Francisco 49ers
On December 13, 2017, McCaffrey was signed by the San Francisco 49ers to a two-year deal off the Packers' practice squad.

On August 29, 2018, McCaffrey was waived/injured by the 49ers after having foot surgery and was placed on injured reserve. He was released the next day. He was suspended for the first four weeks of the season on September 7, 2018. He was reinstated from suspension on October 2. He was re-signed to the 49ers' practice squad on November 27, 2018. On December 29, 2018, McCaffrey was promoted to the active roster.

On August 3, 2019, McCaffrey was waived by the 49ers.

DC Defenders
On October 15, 2019, McCaffrey was drafted in the 8th round of the 2019 XFL draft by the DC Defenders. He was released before the start of the regular season due to accepting a job as the wide receivers coach for the Northern Colorado Bears in January 2020.

McCaffrey was suspended by the NFL for 10 weeks on October 25, 2019. He was reinstated from suspension on December 30, 2019.

Coaching career
McCaffrey joined his father on the University of Northern Colorado coaching staff as a wide receivers coach on January 14, 2020, after abruptly leaving the DC Defenders days into training camp.

McCaffrey was promoted to the Offensive Coordinator in the summer of 2021. As the OC, he still works with the wide receivers.

On March 10, 2023, it was announced that McCaffrey would be an offensive assistant for the Miami Dolphins.

Personal life
Max is the son of Ed and Lisa McCaffrey. His younger brother Christian, was drafted in the first round as a running back by the Carolina Panthers, and played the same position at Stanford. His younger brother Dylan plays for University of Northern Colorado, as a quarterback.  His youngest brother, Luke, is now a redshirt freshman wide receiver at Rice University. His father was a wide receiver in the National Football League for thirteen seasons from 1991–2003 where he played for the New York Giants, San Francisco 49ers and Denver Broncos. His uncle Billy, played two seasons of basketball at Duke and played on the 1991 national championship team before transferring to Vanderbilt and sharing SEC Player of the Year honors in 1992–93.

References

External links
 Duke profile

1994 births
Living people
American football wide receivers
DC Defenders players
Duke Blue Devils football players
Green Bay Packers players
Jacksonville Jaguars players
New Orleans Saints players
Oakland Raiders players
San Francisco 49ers players
People from Castle Rock, Colorado
Players of American football from Colorado
Coaches of American football from Colorado
Northern Colorado Bears football coaches
Sportspeople from the Denver metropolitan area